SS Sulina was a Romanian cargo ship that was torpedoed by the Soviet submarine A-3 and sank on 29 May 1942 near Odessa while carrying general cargo.

Construction 
Sulina was built at the Cantieri Riuniti dell' Adriatico shipyard in Italy in 1939. Where she was launched and completed that same year. The ship could reach a maximum speed of 15.5 knots.

Sinking 
Sulina was torpedoed near Odessa by the Soviet submarine A-3 on 29 May 1942 while carrying a cargo of 4,000 ton of oats, 510 ton of wheat, 2 artillery guns and ammunition. The ship sank but the fate of the crew is unknown.

Wreck 

References

Steamships
Cargo ships
1939 ships
Ships built in Italy
Ships built by Cantieri Riuniti dell'Adriatico
Ships sunk by Soviet submarines
World War II shipwrecks in the Black Sea
World War II merchant ships of Romania
Maritime incidents in May 1942